The rivière Noire (in English: Black River) is a tributary of the Beaurivage River which is a tributary of the east bank of the Chaudière River (slope of the south bank of the St. Lawrence River), in the administrative region of Chaudière-Appalaches, in Quebec, in Canada. It flows in the municipalities of Saint-Flavien, Saint-Agapit, Saint-Gilles (Lotbinière Regional County Municipality) and in the city of Lévis (Saint-Étienne-de-Lauzon sector).

Geography 

The main neighboring watersheds of the Noire River are:
 north side: Rouge River, Aulneuse River, Beaurivage River, rivière des Moulanges;
 east side: Beaurivage River, Chaudière River;
 south side: Rivière du Loup, rivière aux Pins, Henri River, rivière aux Cèdres;
 west side: Bourret stream, Bois Franc-Pierriche stream, rivière aux Ormes, rivière aux Cèdres, Henri River.

The Black River has its source in the municipality of Saint-Flavien.

  eastward, to route 271;
  northeasterly, to Rang des Pointes road;
  north-east, up to the limit of Saint-Agapit;
  northeasterly, up to the limit of Saint-Gilles;
  towards the northeast, in Saint-Gilles, crossing route 116, to the limit of Saint-Étienne-de-Lauzon;
  north-west, up to its confluence.

The Black River empties on the west bank of the Beaurivage River in the hamlet "Pointe-Saint-Gilles", in the town of Lévis (sector of Saint-Étienne-de-Lauzon).

Toponymy 
The toponym "Rivière Noire" was made official on January 22, 1974, in the place name bank of the Commission de toponymie du Québec.

See also 
 List of rivers of Quebec

References 

Rivers of Chaudière-Appalaches
Lotbinière Regional County Municipality
Lévis, Quebec